Marshall Jerome Gauvin (April 3, 1881 – September 23, 1978), best known as Marshall J. Gauvin was a Canadian atheist author and speaker in the freethought movement.

Gauvin was born near Moncton, New Brunswick. He was a contributor to the Truth Seeker, a publication devoted to freethought.

His collected writings are part of the collection of the University of Manitoba. The description of the collection at the Directory of Special Collections of Research Value in Canadian Libraries states that "The collection is noted for its comprehensive holdings in free thought and rationalist literature." and " ...there is substantial material on atheism, biblical studies, science, oratory, early women's studies, and English literature and history."

Selected publications

The Gauvin-Olson Debates on God and the Bible (1921)
Did Jesus Christ Really Live? (1922)
The Illustrated Story of Evolution (1921)
The Fundamentals of Freethought (Peter Eckler Publishing Company, 1922)
The Struggle Between Religion and Science (1923)
Hell: A Christian Doctrine (Truth Seeker Company, 1953) [with Woolsey Teller and Herbert Cutner]

References

Further reading 
 Reasoning Otherwise: Leftists and the People's Enlightenment in Canada, 1890-1920. By Ian McKay. Toronto: Between the Lines, 2008.

1881 births
1978 deaths
Canadian atheists
Christ myth theory proponents
Critics of Christianity
Freethought writers
People from Westmorland County, New Brunswick
Canadian religious writers
Writers from New Brunswick